The United States Post Office-Ogallala is a historic one-story building in Ogallala, Nebraska. It was built as a post office in 1937-1938 by Beckenhauer Bros., and designed in the Moderne style by Louis Simon. Inside, there is a mural of a cowboy and longhorns painted by Frank Mechau. The building has been listed on the National Register of Historic Places since May 11, 1992.

References

Post office buildings on the National Register of Historic Places in Nebraska
National Register of Historic Places in Keith County, Nebraska
Moderne architecture in the United States
Government buildings completed in 1938